Ouéleni   is a department or commune of Léraba Province in south-western  Burkina Faso. Its capital lies at the town of Ouéleni. According to the 1996 census the department has a total population of 10.020.

Towns and villages

 Ouéleni	(911 inhabitants) (capital)
 Bebougou	(567 inhabitants)
 Botogo	(405 inhabitants)
 Foloni	(650 inhabitants)
 Kinga	(260 inhabitants)
 Kobadah	(1 290 inhabitants)
 Namboena	(303 inhabitants)
 Outila	(1 136 inhabitants)
 Pelignan	(443 inhabitants)
 Sarkandiala	(1 097 inhabitants)
 Sele	(208 inhabitants)
 Sountourkou	(657 inhabitants)
 Tena	(1 464 inhabitants)
 Tiongo	(629 inhabitants)
 Ballerville    (22 inhabitants)

References

Departments of Burkina Faso
Léraba Province